Marcelo Fernandes (born 1 January 1991) is a Brazilian footballer who plays for Toledo as a forward.

Club career
In December 2015, Marcelo Fernandes was sold for an undisclosed value to Yangon United.

For Yangon United, Marcelo Fernandes has scored 5 2016 AFC Champions League goals. To name a few, one came against South China AA.
Another goal came versus Chonburi F.C.

References

External links

Marcelo Fernandes at ZeroZero

Living people
1991 births
Brazilian footballers
Brazilian expatriate footballers
Association football forwards
People from Cascavel
Toledo Esporte Clube players
Pato Branco Esporte Clube players
São Bernardo Futebol Clube players
Associação Desportiva São Caetano players
Sociedade Esportiva Palmeiras players
Bangu Atlético Clube players
FC Wacker Innsbruck (2002) players
Sociedade Esportiva e Recreativa Caxias do Sul players
Sport Club Atibaia players
Guaratinguetá Futebol players
Associação Desportiva Cabofriense players
Yangon United F.C. players
Saigon FC players
ABC Futebol Clube players
Esporte Clube XV de Novembro (Piracicaba) players
Clube Atlético Juventus players
FC Cascavel players
Brazilian expatriate sportspeople in Austria
Brazilian expatriate sportspeople in Myanmar
Brazilian expatriate sportspeople in Vietnam
Expatriate footballers in Austria
Expatriate footballers in Myanmar
Expatriate footballers in Vietnam
Sportspeople from Paraná (state)